The Crêta de Vella is a mountain of the Swiss Pennine Alps, located south of Liddes in the canton of Valais. It lies at the northern end of the chain separating the Comba de l'A from the main valley of Entremont.

References

External links
 Crêta de Vella on Hikr

Mountains of the Alps
Mountains of Valais
Mountains of Switzerland
Two-thousanders of Switzerland